The Lowell Grange, also known as Lowell School, in the rural community of Lowell, Oregon, was built in 1940 as a school building.  Later, although in historic era, it was renovated to be used as a Grange hall.  It was listed on the National Register of Historic Places in 2005.

It was then the last surviving historic public building in the community.

References

Grange organizations and buildings in Oregon
National Register of Historic Places in Lane County, Oregon
Buildings and structures in Lane County, Oregon
1913 establishments in Oregon
Grange buildings on the National Register of Historic Places